International Institute of Information Technology, Bhubaneswar (IIIT-BH or IIIT-BBSR) is a self-sustaining state university located in Bhubaneswar, Odisha, India. It is a hybrid model in line with other state technical Universities of Odisha. It is a University Grants Commission (India) (UGC) recognised Unitary Technical University.

The campus is located in Gothapatna, Bhubaneswar. The campus houses classrooms, laboratories, library, hostel, faculty living quarters, sports facilities, and an auditorium.

History
IIIT Bhubaneswar was initiated by the Government of Odisha and registered as a society in 2006. It started operating in September 2007. IIIT Bhubaneswar owes its origins to the private-initiative (self-sustaining) of the Government Odisha. In 2005, the then President of India Dr. APJ Abdul Kalam laid down the foundation stone of the institute. The institute was registered as a society in 2006. The management of the institute is in the hands of a governing body, consisting of representatives from the government of Odisha, leaders from the IT industry and educationists.

Academics

Academic programmes 
The institute offers undergraduate and postgraduate programmes. Undergraduate programs award BTech in information technology and areas of Electrical and Electronics, Electronics and Communication, information Technology and computer science. MTech and PhD programmes are available in computer science and electronics and communication. The institute is a University Grants Commission (India) recognised Unitary Technical University.

Admissions to undergraduate programmes is through the Joint Entrance Examination (JEE Mains). Admission through 50% All India Quota taken by Joint Seat Allocation Authority Government Funded Technical Institutes and 50% reserved quota for Odisha Students and take own counselling.

Student life

Advaita
Advaita is the Annual-cultural and technical festival of the institute. It is largest and awaited grand College Fest of Odisha. Advaita 2018 was held from 8 to 11 February 2018; its theme was "Apocalypse". Advaita 2019 was held from 7 to 10 February 2019; its the theme was "Cosmo Carnival".

Nebulae 
Nebulae is the welcome party for the BTech freshmen. It is usually held within two weeks of the start of the academic year and conducted by the sophomores although 3rd and 4th year seniors participate.

References

Engineering colleges in Odisha
Science and technology in Bhubaneswar
Educational institutions established in 2006
Universities and colleges in Bhubaneswar
Colleges affiliated with Biju Patnaik University of Technology
2006 establishments in Orissa